Martha Dunagin Saunders is an American professor and academic official.  A native of Mississippi, she earned her Bachelor of Arts in French from the University of Southern Mississippi; her Master of Arts in journalism from the University of Georgia; and her Doctor of Philosophy in communication theory and research from Florida State University.  Saunders has served as the chancellor of the University of Wisconsin-Whitewater and the ninth president of the University of Southern Mississippi (USM) where she replaced embattled president Shelby F. Thames.  She is currently serving as president of the University of West Florida in Pensacola, Florida.

Biography

During her tenure at USM, a research university with six teaching/research campuses, the university enjoyed record enrollment, all-time high fundraising and increased national recognition.  She oversaw $255 million in building projects in five years. During USM's budget crisis in 2009-2010 Saunders terminated multiple tenured professors, removed Economics and Physical Education as a major, and cut beneficial on campus student programs in order to raise money for future building projects as well as a multimillion dollar addition/renovation to her Hattiesburg area home which would later be highlighted in an edition of Southern Living Magazine. Due to overwhelming dissatisfaction from the USM faculty and student body she stepped down in 2012 to develop the university's Evelyn Gandy Women's Center for Leadership.

In 2013, she agreed to serve as Provost at the University of West Florida, where she had begun her academic career. In September 2016, the Board of Trustees voted for her to be the new president at the University of West Florida upon the retirement of Judith A. Bense.

Her training and experience in the field of communication led to numerous publications on crisis communication and public relations; widely anthologized published speeches; and two Silver Anvil awards, the Public Relations Society of America’s highest national honor. She is a 2011 national winner of the Stevie Award for Women in Business.  She has served for many years on the Board of Trustees of the Southern Association of Colleges and Schools Commission on Colleges (SACSCOC).

Saunders is married to Joseph Bailey, who retired from the telecommunications industry in 2005.

References

External links
USM names Dr. Martha Dunagin Saunders as ninth president 4/5/2007
Southern Miss Inauguration Video 4/28/2008

Heads of universities and colleges in the United States
Florida State University alumni
University of Georgia alumni
University of Southern Mississippi alumni
Year of birth missing (living people)
People from Hattiesburg, Mississippi
Living people
https://www.wdam.com/story/13065927/usm-announces-15-million-in-budget-cuts/

https://www.gulflive.com/mississippi-press-news/2012/04/southern_miss_president_saunde.html